The Poland national korfball team, is managed by the Polski Związek Korfballu (PZKorf), representing Poland in korfball international competitions.



Tournament history

Current squad

 Coach: Maciej Żak
 Assistant Coach: Roelof Koopmans 
 Team manager: Dawid Waśniewski

Former squads

 Coach: Roelof Koopmans
 Assistant Coach: Maciej Żak

 Coach: Roelof Koopmans
 Assistant Coach: Maciej Żak

 Coach: Roelof Koopmans
 Assistant Coach: Maciej Żak

 Coach: Roelof Koopmans
 Assistant Coach: Maciej Żak

 Coach: Berthold Komduur
 Assistant Coach: Maciej Żak

 Coach: Berthold Komduur

 Coach: Andrzej Czyżak

 Coach: Andrzej Czyżak

 Coach:  Andrzej Czyżak

References

External links
 Polski Związek Korfballu

National korfball teams
Korfball
National team